Ayumi Hamasaki Rock 'n' Roll Circus Tour Final: 7 Days Special is the thirteenth Concert DVD by Ayumi Hamasaki. It was released on April 20, 2011 the same day of the release of Ayumi Hamasaki A 50 Singles: Live Selection. This DVD was also release as a Blu-ray Disc. It was originally scheduled to be released at March 30, but was pushed back till April 20 due to the 2011 Tohoku earthquake and tsunami. It charted strong at #1 while Ayumi Hamasaki A 50 Singles: Live Selection charted behind, at #2, making her the first artist to hold #1 and #2 positions on the Oricon DVD Weekly Chart. The sales of these 2 DVDs made her the artist with the second highest DVD sales in Japan with 2,313,000 units sold, behind Arashi.

Track list
Disc 1:
 Circus
 The Introduction
 Microphone
 Last Angel
 About You
 Solitude
 Rainy Day
 Ballad
 Moon
 Rimbaud
 Count Down
 Memorial Address
 Virgin Road
 Memories
 Don't Look back
 Inspire
 Because of You
 The Carabet
 Sexy Little Things
 Step You
 Jump!
 Lady Dynamite
 Until That Day...
 Surreal ～Evolution～ Surreal

Disc 2:
 Humming 7/4
 Boys & Girls
 Sweet Season
 Seven Days War

Disc 3:
MC compilation of whole concert
Behind-the-scenes footage

Tour dates

Charts
Oricon DVD Chart (Japan)

G-Music DVD Chart (Taiwan)

References

Hamasaki, Ayumi
Live video albums
2011 live albums
2011 video albums
Avex Group live albums
Avex Group video albums
Albums recorded at the Yoyogi National Gymnasium